The Estonia national badminton team represents Estonia in international badminton team competitions. It is controlled by the Estonian Badminton Federation, the governing body for badminton in Estonia. 

The Estonian team participates in the European Team Badminton Championships but have yet to enter the quarterfinals in all men's, women's and mixed team events. The Estonian team also competed in the now defunct Helvetia Cup.

Participation in European Team Badminton Championships

Men's Team

Women's Team

Mixed Team

Participation in Helvetia Cup 
The Helvetia Cup or European B Team Championships was a European mixed team championship in badminton. The first Helvetia Cup tournament took place in Zurich, Switzerland in 1962. The tournament took place every two years from 1971 until 2007, after which it was dissolved. Estonia won third place in the 2007 edition.

Participation in European Junior Team Badminton Championships
Mixed Team

Current squad 
The following players were selected to represent Estonia at the 2020 European Men's and Women's Team Badminton Championships.

Male players
Raul Must
Kristjan Kaljurand
Artur Ajupov
Raul Käsner
Mikk Järveoja
Mihkel Talts
Mihkel Laanes
Karl Kert
Hans-Kristjan Pilve

Female players
Kristin Kuuba
Getter Saar
Kati-Kreet Marran
Helis Pajuste
Catlyn Kruus
Ramona Üprus
Hannaliina Piho

External links
Team at badmintoneurope.com

References

Badminton
National badminton teams
Badminton in Estonia